Arnéguy is a commune in the Pyrénées-Atlantiques department in southwestern France. The village is an important stopping point on the road between Saint-Jean-Pied-de-Port and Pamplona, Spain, as it lies on the border of France and Spain. It is located in the former province of Lower Navarre. Because of its proximity to Saint-Jean-Pied-de-Port, Arnéguy is a popular tourist destination for those travelling across the Pyrenees, although its economy remains mostly agricultural.

See also
Communes of the Pyrénées-Atlantiques department

References

External links

Official site
 ARNEGI in the Bernardo Estornés Lasa - Auñamendi Encyclopedia (Euskomedia Fundazioa) (in Spanish)

Communes of Pyrénées-Atlantiques
Lower Navarre